Forest Ecology and Management is a semimonthly peer-reviewed scientific journal covering forest ecology and the management of forest resources. The journal publishes research manuscripts that report results of original research, review articles, and book reviews. Forestry-related topics are covered that apply biological and social knowledge to address problems encountered in forest management and conservation.

See also

List of forestry journals

References

External links

Forestry journals
Elsevier academic journals
Semi-monthly journals
Publications established in 1977
English-language journals